Booterstown railway station serves Booterstown in Dún Laoghaire–Rathdown, Ireland.

The station is located on the coast, bordering the bird sanctuary of Booterstown marsh to the west and southeast. The road linking the station to the Rock Road runs to the southwest, with a car park beside it.

The ticket office is open between 06:00-00:00 AM, Monday to Sunday.

History

The station opened in January 1835. It closed for a period from 1960, but reopened with the coming of the DART in 1984.

The footbridge at the south end of the station was used in 1980 as the cover photographic image for the pop music single A Day Without Me by the band U2.

Transport services 
Directly outside the station on the Rock Road, are bus stops for the following routes

Dublin Bus:

 Route 4 from Harristown to Monkstown
 Routes 7 / 7A from Mountjoy Square to Bride's Glen / Loughlinstown. Route 7 provides a connection to the Luas Green Line terminus at Bride's Glen
 7N Nitelink from Dublin city centre to Shankill, via Blackrock (Friday & Saturday only)
 84N Nitelink from Dublin city centre to Greystones, via Blackrock (Friday & Saturday only)

Private Operators

 Aircoach route 702 from Greystones to Dublin Airport, via Booterstown
 Aircoach route 703 from Killiney to Dublin Airport, via Booterstown

See also 
 List of railway stations in Ireland

References

External links 

 Irish Rail Booterstown Station website

Iarnród Éireann stations in Dún Laoghaire–Rathdown
Booterstown
1835 establishments in Ireland
Railway stations in the Republic of Ireland opened in 1835